Ah Lev is a 2003 Khmer comedy film. It stars Sovann Makura, Danh Monika and Suos Sotheara.

Plot
Ah Lev convinces his mother that his father is dead. Meanwhile, convincing his father that his mother is dead.

Cast
Sovann Makura
Danh Monika
Suos Sotheara

Cambodian comedy films
2003 films
2003 comedy films